Transvision may refer to:

Transvision (Indonesia), an Indonesian subscription-based direct broadcast satellite provider service
Transvision (Alva Noto EP), a 2005 album by German electronic artist Alva Noto
TransVision, an annual conference held by Humanity+ from 1998 to 2007 and 2018 to 2020
Transvision (manufacturer), a television manufacturer from 1947 to 1967
Transvision, an Irish large-format network of digital screens in commuter venues partnered with RTÉ News and Current Affairs

See also
Transvision Vamp, an English alternative rock band active from 1986 to 1992